The December 2014 Cameroon clashes were a number of incidents that occurred between 28–29 December 2014 in variety of locations in Cameroon's Far North Region. The event included attacks on civilians and military positions carried out by Nigeria-based Boko Haram; the attacks were followed by a successful Cameroonian military counter offensive.

Background
During 2014, Boko Haram militants conducted a number of attacks on villages located within northern Cameroon, killing at least 40 government soldiers and recruiting hundreds of people into the organization.

Incident
On 26 December 2014, Boko Haram insurgents killed a Cameroonian soldier and wounded three others on the Waza-Mora highway. A military vehicle was also seized in the attack.

On 28 December 2014, Cameroonian troops repelled four simultaneous Boko Haram raids into the towns of Makary, Amchide, Limani, Guirvidig, Waza and Achigachia, located in Cameroon's Far North Region.
The Cameroonian air force bombed an insurgent camp in Soueram killing 53 militants, while at the same time militants carried an assault on the  Mbaljuel village which left 30 civilians dead. The bombing prompted the militants to abandon the Achigachia military base they had previously occupied.

On 29 December 2014, the Cameroonian military launched a counter offensive on militant bases in the towns of Chogori and Waza. A total of 41 militants and one soldier were killed during the incident, according to Cameroonian officials. Boko Haram fighters retreated back into Nigeria, and 84 children and a number of militants were detained. Authorities estimated the number of rebels involved in the raid to be 1,000 fighters.

See also 
Refugees in Cameroon

References

Attacks in Africa in 2014
Boko Haram attacks
Mass murder in 2014
Massacres in Cameroon
Terrorist incidents in Cameroon in 2014
Islamic terrorist incidents in 2014
December 2014 events in Africa